Imantodes is a genus of colubrid snakes commonly referred to as blunt-headed vine snakes or blunt-headed tree snakes. The genus consists of seven species that are native to Mexico, Central America, and the northern part of South America.

Species
There are currently eight recognized species:
Imantodes cenchoa  – neotropical blunt-headed treesnake, blunthead treesnake, fiddle-string snake
Imantodes chocoensis  – Chocoan blunt-headed vine snake
Imantodes gemmistratus  – Central American tree snake
Imantodes guane 
Imantodes inornatus  - western tree snake
Imantodes lentiferus  - Amazon Basin tree snake
Imantodes phantasma  - phantasma tree snake
Imantodes tenuissimus  – Yucatán blunthead snake
Nota bene: A binomial authority in parentheses indicates that the species was originally described in a genus other than Imantodes.

References

Further reading
Boulenger GA (1896). Catalogue of the Snakes in the British Museum (Natural History). Volume III., Containing the Colubridæ (Opisthoglyphæ and Proteroglyphæ) ... London: Trustees of the British Museum (Natural History). (Taylor and Francis, printers). xiv + 727 pp. + Plates I-XXV. (Genus "Himantodes [sic]", p. 83).
Duméril [AMC] (1853). "Prodrome de la classification des reptiles ophidiens ". Mémoires de l'Académie des sciences, Paris 23: 399–536. (Imantodes, new genus, p. 507). (in French).
Freiberg M (1982). Snakes of South America. Hong Kong: T.F.H. Publications. 189 pp. . (Imantodes, pp. 49, 67, 68, 71, 100).
Goin CJ, Goin OB, Zug GR (1978). Introduction to Herpetology, Third Edition. San Francisco: W.H. Freeman and Company. xi + 378 pp. . (Imantodes, pp. 324–325, Figure "16-17").

External links

Imantodes
Snake genera
Taxa named by André Marie Constant Duméril